The 1964 All-Southwest Conference football team consists of American football players chosen by various organizations for All-Southwest Conference teams for the 1964 NCAA University Division football season.  The selectors for the 1964 season included the Associated Press (AP) and the United Press International (UPI).  Players selected as first-team players by both the AP and UPI are designated in bold.

All Southwest selections

Backs
 Fred Marshall, Arkansas (AP-1 [QB]; UPI-1)
 Donnie Anderson, Texas Tech (AP-1 [HB]; UPI-1)
 Harold Philipp, Texas (AP-1 [FB]; UPI-1)
 Jim Fauver, TCU (UPI-1)
 Ken Hatfield, Arkansas (AP-1 [defensive halfback])
 Joe Dixon, Texas (AP-1 [defensive halfback])
 Mike Pitman, Texas A&M (AP-1 [defensive halfback])

Ends
 Larry Elkins, Baylor (AP-1 [offensive end]; UPI-1)
 Jerry Lamb, Arkansas (AP-1 [offensive end]; UPI-1)
 Knox Nunnally, Texas (AP-1 [defensive end])
 Dan Mauldin, Texas (AP-1 [defensive end])

Tackles
 Glen Ray Hines, Arkansas (AP-1 [offensive tackle]; UPI-1)
 Ray Hinze, Texas A&M (UPI-1)
 Clayton Lacy, Texas (AP-1 [offensive tackle])
 Lloyd Phillips, Arkansas (AP-1 [defensive tackle])
 Jim Williams, Arkansas (AP-1 [defensive tackle])

Guards
 Tommy Nobis, Texas (AP-1 [offensive guard and linebacker]; UPI-1)
 Ronnie Caveness, Arkansas (AP-1 [linebacker]; UPI-1)
 Steve Garmon, TCU (AP-1 [offensive guard])
 John LaGrone, SMU (AP-1 [defensive guard])
 Jimmy Johnson, Arkansas (AP-1 [defensive guard])

Centers
 Malcolm Walker, Rice (UPI-1)
 Olen Underwood, Texas (AP-1)

Key

See also
1964 College Football All-America Team

References

All-Southwest Conference
All-Southwest Conference football teams